Herbert Norsch (August 15, 1908 – July 28, 1955) was an American sound engineer. He was nominated for an Oscar for Best Special Effects on the film Women in War at the 13th Academy Awards.

References

External links

1908 births
1955 deaths
American audio engineers
People from St. Louis
20th-century American engineers